Abdul Karim Farhani (Persian: عبدالکریم فرحانی) is regarded as an Iranian principlist member of Assembly of Experts, who is one of Khuzestan province representatives in the 5th period of that. He was born in Ahwaz in 1964 (1343SH). Ayatollah Bahjat and Ayatollah Fazel Lankarani are among his famous teachers in high-level classes in Qom Seminary. Meanwhile, he is a teacher of Arabic literature, logic, Fiqh, philosophy and so on.

References

1964 births
Living people
Members of the Assembly of Experts for Constitution

Iranian ayatollahs
People from Khuzestan Province
Iranian people of African descent